Hall Lake is a lake in Martin County, in the U.S. state of Minnesota.

Hall Lake was named for E. Banks Hall, a pioneer settler.

See also
List of lakes in Minnesota

References

Lakes of Minnesota
Lakes of Martin County, Minnesota